Four ships of the Royal Navy have carried the name HMS Crocus, after the crocus, a genus of flowering plants.

  was a 14-gun sloop launched in 1808 and sold in 1815.
  was a wooden screw  gunboat launched in 1856 and broken up in 1864.
  was an  minesweeping sloop launched in 1915 and sold in 1930.
  was a  launched in 1940 and sold into civilian service in 1946 under the name Annlock.

Royal Navy ship names